Luis Manuel Rubiales Béjar (born 23 August 1977) is a Spanish football official and former professional player who played as a defender. He is the current president of the Royal Spanish Football Federation.

Known for not being a very skilled player but a tenacious one – he only appeared in 53 La Liga matches over three seasons – he received the nickname Pundonor (Courage).

Playing career
Rubiales was born in Las Palmas, Canary Islands, being raised in Motril in the Province of Granada. During his Spanish career, spent mainly in Segunda División, he represented Guadix CF, RCD Mallorca B, UE Lleida, Xerez CD, Levante UD (gaining promotion to La Liga in 2004 and 2006) and Alicante CF. He made his debut in the Spanish top flight on 29 August 2004, coming on as a late substitute in a 1–1 away draw against Real Sociedad.

On 4 August 2009, it was announced he had agreed a one-year deal at Scottish Premier League side Hamilton Academical. However, after only three league appearances – four official – he left the club and returned to his country.

Post-retirement
In March 2010, already retired, Rubiales was elected president of the Association of Spanish Footballers. He quit his post in November 2017 with the intention of running for office at the Royal Spanish Football Federation, being elected its president in May 2018; in one of his first actions, he sacked Spain head coach Julen Lopetegui immediately before the 2018 FIFA World Cup, having not been informed by the latter that he was negotiating to become the new manager of Real Madrid. 

On 8 September 2018, Rubiales gave an interview in which he criticised the Spanish League president Javier Tebas for signing a contract that would see matches being played in the United States. The former explained that the deal was "worthless" without the Spanish Federation's approval.

Honours
Levante
Segunda División: 2003–04

References

External links

1977 births
Living people
People from Motril
Sportspeople from the Province of Granada
Spanish footballers
Footballers from Andalusia
Footballers from Las Palmas
Association football defenders
La Liga players
Segunda División players
Segunda División B players
Tercera División players
RCD Mallorca B players
RCD Mallorca players
UE Lleida players
Xerez CD footballers
Levante UD footballers
Alicante CF footballers
Scottish Premier League players
Hamilton Academical F.C. players
Spanish expatriate footballers
Expatriate footballers in Scotland
Spanish expatriate sportspeople in Scotland
Presidents of the Spanish Football Federation
Spanish trade union leaders